The Chief of Defence Force is the head of the Singapore Armed Forces (SAF), who holds the rank Lieutenant-General or Vice-Admiral.

The position was created in 1974 as Chief of the General Staff, with the appointment of Winston Choo, before changing to its current name in May 1990. Prior to the appointment of Choo as Chief of the General Staff, the Ministry of Defence was in charge of the SAF. Before the position was created, the head of Singapore Army—which at that time made up the military—held the position of Director, General Staff.

The president has the power to appoint each new CDF, as well as new chief of each of the four services in the SAF, on the advice of the prime minister, who in turn must consult with the Armed Forces Council, on which the CDF sits. The CDF also maintains a role as an aide-de-camp to the president.

Role
The CDF is the operational head of the SAF, and holds a seat on the Armed Forces Council which oversees all matters pertaining to the SAF. In addition, if any of the four service chiefs—the Chief of Army, Chief of Navy, Chief of Air Force or Chief of Digital and Intellegence Service—is unable to carry out his duties, the CDF is tasked to perform those duties in addition to his own. If the CDF is unable to perform his own duties, the Minister of Defence is allowed to select one of the four service chiefs to perform the CDF's duties.

The office of CDF also carries with it a position as one of three full-time aides-de-camp to the President. According to the Singapore Presidential Office website, the position entails handling the President's security and his/her social needs, in addition to other general duties.

A number of powers relating to summary trials for military offences is vested in the CDF. Paragraph 2, Section 62 of the Singapore Armed Forces Act states that any offence in which the accused holds the rank of Colonel or Military Expert 7 is to be referred to the CDF, who can then dismiss the charge, hold a summary trial, or pass the case on to the director of legal services of the SAF, who can in turn instruct the CDF to try the accused.

As head of the SAF, the CDF often makes visits to countries with shared military interests, such as Bahrain, Japan, and Vietnam, and also occasionally hosts foreign military chiefs on official visits.

List of officeholders (1965–1990)
The role of the head of the SAF was first titled as "Director, General Staff" around 1969, and was held by Brigadier-General T. J. D. Campbell, who was previously Head of the Singapore Defence Force (1965–1966), and the Singapore Volunteer Corps (late 1950s–1965) before the independence of Singapore in 1965. Campbell had been Acting Director since around 1968. Colonel Kirpa Ram Vij was appointed his successor. According to sources, the position of "Director, General Staff" was considered similar to the position of the present-day CDF, and was equivalent to Chief of Army. A news report from The Straits Times on Campbell's death refers to him as having been "army chief."

In 1974, Colonel Winston Choo was given the appointment of Chief of the General Staff, having previously been a departmental head at the Ministry of Defence (MINDEF). In May 1990, the position was changed to its current name, with Choo, who had been promoted to Lieutenant-General, still in office. He had been promoted to each of the general ranks in 1974, 1978 and 1988. Choo stepped down in 1992, after 18 years as the head of the SAF.

Prime Minister Lee Kuan Yew described Goh Keng Swee as the de facto armed forces chief of staff when the latter was Minister for Defence. Goh had been responsible for evolving the SAF while serving as Minister for Defence from 1965 to 1967.

Although Campbell and Vij have both held a position of similar authority, Choo is referred to as the first CDF in a number of MINDEF publications.

In the past, there also existed a Deputy Chief of the General Staff, who was tasked to "[work] with troops on the ground," but there is no deputy position for the present-day CDF in the structure of the SAF.

List of chiefs of Defence Force (1990–present)

Since the appointment of CDF was established in 1990, there have been seven holders to the position, beginning with Winston Choo who was already in office as Chief of the General Staff.

In their retirement citations from the Ministry of Defence,
 Both Bey Soo Khiang and Lim Chuan Poh were cited for having "positioned the SAF to meet the challenges in the 21st century" and for improving the SAF's capacity to use latest technology in advancing the forces' proficiency;
 Ng Yat Chung's retirement citation noted that he "successfully commanded the overall deployment of the SAF in peace support operations in East Timor" and disaster relief after both the 2004 Indian Ocean earthquake and tsunami and the 2006 Yogyakarta earthquake;
 Desmond Kuek was cited for "(leading) the SAF's transformation into a modernised, integrated and networked fighting force" and "significantly (enhancing) the SAF's ability to deal effectively with the evolving security challenges".

Notes

References

 
Singapore